Kankaanranta is a Finnish surname. It may refer to:

 Aksel Kankaanranta (born 1998), Finnish singer who would've represented Finland in the Eurovision Song Contest 2020
 Tellervo Kankaanranta, birthname of Tellervo Koivisto (born 1929), Finnish politician, former First Lady of Finland from 1982 to 1994

Finnish-language surnames